Shahab ol Din (also Romanized as Shahāb ol Dīn, Shahāb od Dīn, and Shahābuddīn) is a village in Chaharduli-ye Gharbi Rural District, Chaharduli District, Qorveh County, Kurdistan Province, Iran. At the 2006 census, its population was 401, in 75 families. The village is populated by Kurds.

References 

Towns and villages in Qorveh County
Kurdish settlements in Kurdistan Province